The Armed Forces of the Pridnestrovian Moldavian Republic (Moldovan Cyrillic: Форцеле армате але Републичий Молдовенешть Нистрене;) are the military forces of the unrecognized state of Transnistria. The Armed Forces fall under the leadership of the Ministry of Defence. The Armed Forces were created on 6 September 1991 to maintain the sovereignty and independence of the Pridnestrovian Moldavian Republic, in accordance with Article 11 of the Republic's Constitution.

History
On 6 September 1991, the Supreme Soviet of Transnistria adopted a resolution which called for the formation of a Transnistrian military unit. As a result, the Transnistria Republican Guard was formed. It was the direct counterpart to the Republic of Moldova's Republican Guard. Both were the predecessors to their respective countries armed forces. In its first major conflict, the guard repelled Moldovan troops from the city Dubăsari in December 1991. By the end of 1991, the organizational formation of the Transnistrian armed forces was generally completed. Shortly after the outbreak of Transnistrian War in March 1992, the People's Militia was created, having been supported and armed by the Russian Armed Forces 14th Guards Army. By the end of 1992, all main structures of the Ministry of Defence and the General Staff were formed, including individual military units, government agencies, and specialized services. On 14 March 1993, personnel of the new armed forces took the military oath of allegiance to the country. As of 2021 Transnistria is equipped mainly with Soviet-Era equipment including the T-64BV tank which is still quite capable given Moldova does not own any tanks. Infantry fighting vehicles are the BMP-1 and BMP-2 with at least 15 in service as of 2021. APCs include the BTR family of APCs as well as over 70 MT-LBs, GT-MU, and BTRG-127 vehicles. Trucks are typically post-Soviet, Ural-375, GAZ-66, and Zil-131 trucks make up the logistics backbone. Rocket artillery is very important for the Armed Forces given the limited number of conventional artillery Transnistria has. Rocket launchers include the Grad system, some of which were placed on ZIL-131 trucks. Transnistria also has a domestic rocket launcher industry which has built the Pribor-1 and Pribor-2 rocket launchers with 20 tubes and 48 tubes respectively, both systems are of 122mm caliber. Transnistria does have a small domestic drone industry which has been producing reconnaissance drones for the military since at least 2019. These have been jointly used with the Pribor-2 rocket launch systems in exercises to increase accuracy of the rockets via drone targeting.

Structure
The armed forces are composed of 4,500 to 5,500 active duty soldiers, (with 15,000 - 20,000 personnel in the reserve).

In order of precedence, the current military leadership is composed of the following:
 President of Transnistria/Commander-in-Chief – President of Transnistria Vadim Krasnoselsky
 Minister of Defence – Major General Oleg Obruchkov
 Chief of the General Staff – Colonel Sergey Gerasyutenko

Units

Regular Army
 1st Guards Motorised Infantry Brigade "Stefan Kitzac" (Tiraspol)
 2nd Motorised Infantry Brigade (Bender)
 3rd Motorised Infantry Brigade (Rîbnița)
 4th Motorised Infantry Brigade (Dubăsari)
 1st Independent Aviation Detachment
 Tank Battalion
 Artillery Regiment
 Anti-aircraft Regiment
 Special Forces Battalion
 Security Battalion
 Intelligence Company
 Airborne Infantry (VDV)

Additional support is provided by the Operational Group of Russian Forces of the Russian Army, based in the Transnistrian city of Cobasna.

Specialized Units
 General Staff of the Armed Forces – It is the commanding and managing body of the armed forces. It is tasked with enforcing military strategy which comes from the ministry of defense.
 PMR Honour Guard – Since its establishment on 6 November 1997, the PMR Honour Guard has taken part in the welcoming of honoured guests and festive and ceremonies. Notable commanders of the unit include Yaroslav Isak, Valentin Rasputin and Artem Chernichenko.
 General Staff Band – The band's musicians must have at least a year of experience in the musical services of the Russian, Moldovan, and Ukrainian armed forces. Their repertoire includes over 500 works by foreign composers. The band is led by Colonel Vitaly Voinov.
 Peacekeeping Force

Military education

Higher education

Military Institute of the Ministry of Defense – Founded in May 1993, it is the seniormost military institution in the armed forces. It was reorganized as an independent institution from the Shevchenko Transnistria State University on 30 April 2008. In August 2009, the institute was awarded a battle flag and was given the honor of being renamed to honor Alexander Lebed in July 2012.
 Basic training courses for military specialists

Cadet schools
Tiraspol Suvorov Military School – It was founded on 1 September 2017 and is based on the Suvorov Military Schools in Russia and Belarus
Grigory Potemkin Republican Cadet Corps

Security forces
 Ministry of State Security
 PMR Border Guard
 Independent Battalion of Special Operations "Delta"
 Special Motorized Military Unit of the Ministry of Internal Affairs (formed in 1995)
 Spetsnaz

Culture

Events
On Republic Day and Victory Day, two-hour military parades of the Armed Forces of Transnistria is annually held on Suvorov Square, usually featuring over 15 military contingents overseen by the president, the Prime Minister and members of the Supreme Council. A historical mechanized convoy is usually assembled at the parade. In 2020, due to the COVID-19 pandemic, the two jubilee celebrations were merged on 2 September.

The official armed forces holiday is Defender of the Fatherland Day on 23 February, which celebrated similarly to Russia and the Commonwealth of Independent States. Other military holidays include:

 Internal Troops Day (March 24)
 Liberation Day (April 12)
 State Security Day (May 16)
 Peacekeeper Day (July 28)
 Armed Forces Day (September 6)
 Border Guards Day (September 14)

Institutions

Museum

The Military History Museum of the Armed Forces was opened on 13 November 1999 by President Smirnov together with Defense Minister Stanislav Hazheev. It has been visited by more than 20,000 servicemen, students, and tourists. The main attraction is the diorama "Storming the bridge over the Dniester", which depicts an episode of the battle on 20 June 1992. The museum is conventionally divided into two parts: exhibits and archival photographs. The central area is occupied by a ring in memory of fallen guardsmen.

Sports Club
The Army Sports Club in Transnistria is a sports movement in the army that has the involvement of not only active military personnel, but also retired ones, as well as their family members, and pre-conscription youth. Almost anyone who wants to compete under the SKA banner are able to join the club. It was created as part of a return to the traditions of Soviet sports.

Equipment

Aircraft

Retired aircraft
Previous aircraft operated were the Antonov An-26, Antonov An-2, Yakovlev Yak-52, and the Mil Mi-2 helicopter.

References

External links
 Official website, Ministry of Defense
 Pridnestrovie.net, Law enforcement and armed forces of Transnistria (archived link)

Military of Transnistria
Transnistria